The Nerang River is a perennial river located in South East Queensland, Australia.

Course and features
The river descends  over its  course. Major crossings of the river occur at Nerang where the river is crossed by the Pacific Motorway and at Southport where the river is crossed by the Gold Coast Highway.

The Nerang River catchment is the largest and most significant river system on the Gold Coast. Its upper reaches in the McPherson Range and Springbrook Plateau deliver flows through significant rural areas and also feed into the Hinze Dam, creating Advancetown Lake, the Gold Coast's main water supply, and Little Nerang Dam. These two reservoirs provide a large percentage of potable water for the Gold Coast and are managed by Gold Coast Water. The Hinze Dam has had a significant flood mitigation effect. In the river's lower catchment, multi-branched canal developments and a number of artificial tidal and freshwater lake systems have influenced and altered large aras of the floodplain. These canal developments provide a range of opportunities for many residents including boating and recreational fishing. The canals and lakes provide habitat to a range of aquatic, terrestrial and marine flora and fauna. The canal systems provide for drainage of stormwater and contribute to flood mitigation, but can periodically be subject to contamination via stormwater drainage.

A number of islands are located in the canal region of the river's lower catchment, including the Girung, Paradise, Chevron, Cronin and McIntosh Islands. Two man-made lakes are also located in the lower catchment, including the Lake Rosser and Lake Capabella.

The river's mouth was once located much further south.  In the early 1800s it entered the ocean at Broadbeach and by 1930 its mouth was located where Sea World now is.  The main driving force for this movement is the northward drift of sand along the coast.

Crossings
A number of river crossings of the Nerang River are named, including the following listed below (from upstream to downstream), together with their location relative to tributaries of the river:

Etymology

The river was initially named the River Barrow by government surveyor Robert Dixon when he charted the Gold Coast in 1840, after Sir John Barrow, Secretary of the Admiralty.  The surveyor general Thomas Mitchell later changed many places to Aboriginal names, and this included giving the Nerang River its present name.  Neerang or neerung are Yugambeh words meaning "little shark" or "shovel-nosed shark".  But the local aboriginal people called the river Mogumbin or Been-goor-abee; and the peoples of the Tweed called it Talgai.

History
In June 1967, the development of an east coast low lead to the rising of waters in the river that went on to flood significant lands upriver from Surfers Paradise.

Recreation

Surfers Riverwalk

The City of Gold Coast council's "Surfers Riverwalk" coastal pathway links Sundale Bridge, Macintosh Island, Budd's Beach, Surfers Central Riverwalk, Cascade Gardens, the Gold Coast Convention and Exhibition Centre, Casino Island and Pacific Fair Shopping Centre.

Boat ramps
Boat ramps that are open to the public are located at Waterways Drive at Main Beach, Budds Beach, Evandale, on the Isle of Capri, TE Peters Drive at Broadbeach Waters (Convention Centre), Carrara Road, Carrara, and at the Nerang River Parklands.

Nerang Riverkeepers Group
Established in 2000, under the Beaches to Bushland Volunteer restoration program, the group works to restore local endemic species along the Nerang River.  A major ongoing project is control of the invasive cats claw creeper, registered as a Weed of National Significance.  Cat’s claw creeper was introduced to Australia. It is native to Central and South America and the West Indies. It was first reported as naturalised in the 1950s. The seeds spread by wind or water. A woody vine, it invades warm native forests killing native trees and undergrowth. If cut down it can regrow from persistent underground tubers.

See also

References

External links

The History of the Gold Coast at reflections.com.au

Geography of Gold Coast, Queensland
Rivers of Queensland
History of Gold Coast, Queensland
Articles containing video clips